Bonne Femme Creek (also known as Big Bonne Femme Creek) is a stream in Boone County in the U.S. state of Missouri. It is a tributary of the Missouri River. The creek is one of the "three creeks" of Three Creeks Conservation Area. According to tradition, Bonne Femme ("good woman") was the nickname of an Indian who helped a French settler recover from his wounds. Its two major tributaries are Turkey Creek and Bass Creek.

See also
List of rivers of Missouri

References

Geography of Columbia, Missouri
Rivers of Boone County, Missouri
Rivers of Missouri